Anglo-Saxon religion may refer to several distinct periods, events and types of religion in the British Isles:

The pre-Christian Anglo-Saxon polytheism
The Christianization of the Anglo-Saxons by Germanic Christianity and the Anglo-Saxon mission
Anglo-Saxon Christianity
The post-reformation Anglican Church or Presbyterianism
Revival of Anglo-Saxon polytheism as part of Heathenry (new religious movement)

Christianity in Anglo-Saxon England
Germanic religion